The Howard Motor Company Building (also known as California Custom Coach, Inc.) is a historic automobile showroom located at 1285 E. Colorado Boulevard in Pasadena, California.

Description and history 
The Howard Motor Company built the showroom in 1927; it was one of several car dealerships built along Colorado Boulevard. The building is designed in a California Churrigueresque style of Spanish Colonial Revival architecture; its design includes a decorative frieze, chanfered corners, and an elliptical arched entrance topped by the dominant Churrigueresque element. The Bush-Morgan Motor Company moved into the building in 1938 and occupied it through the 1950s. The building was still used as an auto showroom in the 1990s.

The building was added to the National Register of Historic Places on April 18, 1996.

References

Commercial buildings on the National Register of Historic Places in California
Spanish Colonial Revival architecture in California
Commercial buildings completed in 1927
Buildings and structures on the National Register of Historic Places in Pasadena, California
Buildings and structures in Pasadena, California
Auto dealerships on the National Register of Historic Places
Transportation buildings and structures on the National Register of Historic Places in California